Deham (The Body) is a 2001 film directed by Govind Nihalani based on playwright Manjula Padmanabhan's play Harvest. It has Kitu Gidwani, Joy Sengupta, Alyy Khan, Surekha Sikri and Julie Ames in lead roles. It is a futuristic story depicting the organ sale from relatively poorer countries to the rich. Nihalani himself called it a "serious social sci-fi film". Deham won the prestigious Netpac (Network for Promotion of Asian Cinema) award for the Best Asian Film at the 25th Goteborg Film Festival, 2002, in Sweden.

Plot
It's 2022. Om Prakash, a jobless young man lives with his wife Jaya, mother and younger brother Jeetu in a one-room tenement in Mumbai. He falls for a multinational company's offer to provide his family a life of luxury for the rest of their lives in exchange for body organs for wealthy foreign clients. The family's life changes as he signs the contract. They lose their privacy as the company watches their every move. As part of the contract, Om has to pose as a bachelor and Jaya, his wife, is forced to call herself his sister. But Jeetu, who works as a gigolo, refuses to permit himself to be controlled and walks out of home. After few months as Om, Jaya and his mother, are growing accustomed to their new life, Jeetu comes back, battered and beaten. As Jaya nurses him the time for the organ transplants comes. The company officials come and take away Jeetu instead of Om for the transplants. Jaya, who has been putting up with it all for long, finally, refuses to become a party to the contract and chooses freedom instead.

Reception
Govind Nihalani's strong credentials as one of the finest directors of Indian cinema apart, the reviews were mostly unfavourable. "Unforgivably bludgeoning Manjula Padmanabhan's cleverly-crafted play with poor FX and miserly production values, Nihalani stumbles," Pramila N. Phatarphekar wrote in Outlook calling the film's vision "impaired".

"..you cannot help but feel sorry for a plot that has been mutilated carelessly," wrote Priya Ganapati, reviewing the film for Rediff, adding, "What makes it an utter disaster is its combination of a terrible screenplay, stilted acting, poor dialogues and more important, an inability to infuse soul or imagination to a plot that in its very premise demands an abundance of it."

Cast
Kitu Gidwani as Jaya 
Joy Sengupta as Om Prakash
Alyy Khan as Jeetu, Om's brother
Surekha Sikri as Om's mother 
Julie Ames as Virginia, the American organ-buyer

References

External links

2001 films
Indian films based on plays
English-language Indian films
Films directed by Govind Nihalani
Indian science fiction drama films
Films set in 2022
Films set in Mumbai
2000s science fiction drama films
2000s English-language films